Do-Can is the fourth album by Masami Okui, released on September 23, 1998.

Track listing
Makoon ~1999~ (instrumental)
 Composition, arrangement: Tsutomu Ohira
 Chorus: Masami Okui
 （L.A. version） 
 anime television Cyber Team in Akihabara soundtrack
 Lyrics: Masami Okui
 Composition, arrangement: Toshiro Yabuki
Kiss in the dark
 PS game Evil Zone theme song
 Lyrics, composition: Masami Okui
 Arrangement: Tsutomu Ohira
BIG-3
 Lyrics: Masami Okui
 Composition, arrangement: Toshiro Yabuki
 Chorus: Toshiro Yabuki
 (isamix)
 anime television Cyber Team in Akihabara ending song
 Lyrics, composition: Masami Okui
 Arrangement: Toshiro Yabuki

 Lyrics, composition: Masami Okui
 Arrangement: Tsutomu Ohira
Eve
 Lyrics, composition: Masami Okui
 Arrangement: Tsutomu Ohira
 Chorus: Toshiro Yabuki, Tsutomu Ohira
Climax
 Lyrics: Masami Okui
 Composition, arrangement: Toshiro Yabuki
Birth (takemix)
 anime television Cyber Team in Akihabara opening song
 Lyrics: Masami Okui
 Composition: Masami Okui, Toshiro Yabuki
 Arrangement: Toshiro Yabuki

 Extra compilation for Souda, zettai.
 Lyrics: Masami Okui
 Composition, arrangement: Toshiro Yabuki
 （daitamix） 
 Radio drama Cyber Team in Akihabara theme
 Lyrics: Masami Okui
 Composition, arrangement: Toshiro Yabuki

 Lyrics, composition: Masami Okui
 Arrangement: Tsutomu Ohira

Sources
Official website: Makusonia

1998 albums
Masami Okui albums